Prairie oyster may refer to:

 Rocky Mountain oysters, bull testicles eaten as food
 Prairie Oyster, a Canadian country band
 Prairie oyster (cocktail), a traditional hangover cure